The following diamond-certified albums in Canada have sold at least one million units (individual CDs, tapes or LPs) as determined by Canadian Recording Industry Association, the national music recording sales certification agency.

 

The first million-selling album in Canada was declared in May 1978 as Rumours by the British band Fleetwood Mac. 17 years later, that album was honoured for sales of a second million units.

Diamond albums
The following albums have sold at least one million units within Canada. This certification has been attained by 18 Canadian albums, representing 11 artists and one compilation album. A Canadian artist, Céline Dion, holds the record for the most diamond albums, having had six albums reach this sales status in Canada.

Double Diamond albums
Double diamond awards are issued to albums that have sold two million units, representing the highest-selling music albums in Canadian history. Only two Canadian artists, Alanis Morissette and Shania Twain, have attained this level of certification; Twain and Pink Floyd are the only two artists to have reached it with more than one album.

See also

The Top 100 Canadian Albums
List of best-selling albums in Canada
List of number-one singles (Canada)

References

External links
 CRIA: music certification

Canada, diamond
 
Canada